Pomona College is a private liberal arts college in Claremont, California. It was established in 1887 by a group of Congregationalists who wanted to recreate a "college of the New England type" in Southern California. In 1925, it became the founding member of the Claremont Colleges consortium of adjacent, affiliated institutions.

Pomona is a four-year undergraduate institution that  approximately  students. It offers 48 majors in liberal arts disciplines and roughly 650 courses, as well as access to more than 2,000 additional courses at the other Claremont Colleges.

Pomona has the lowest acceptance rate of any U.S. liberal arts college  and is considered the most prestigious liberal arts college in the American West and one of the most prestigious in the country. It has a $ endowment , making it the seventh-wealthiest college or university in the U.S. on a per student basis. Nearly all students live on campus, and the student body is noted for its racial, geographic, and socioeconomic diversity. The college's athletics teams, the Sagehens, compete jointly with Pitzer College in the SCIAC, a Division III conference.

Prominent alumni of Pomona include Oscar, Emmy, Grammy, and Tony award winners; U.S. Senators, ambassadors, and other federal officials; Pulitzer Prize recipients; billionaire executives; a Nobel Prize laureate; National Academies members; and Olympic athletes. The college is a top producer of Fulbright scholars and recipients of other fellowships.

History

Founding era

Pomona College was established as a coeducational and nonsectarian Christian institution on October 14, 1887, amidst a real estate boom and anticipated population influx precipitated by the arrival of a transcontinental railroad to Southern California. Its founders, a regional group of Congregationalists, sought to create a "college of the New England type", emulating the institutions where many of them had been educated. Classes first began at Ayer Cottage, a rental house in Pomona, California, on September 12, 1888, with a permanent campus planned at Piedmont Mesa four miles north of the city. That year, as the real estate bubble burst, making the Piedmont campus financially untenable, the college was offered the site of an unfinished hotel (later renamed Sumner Hall) in the nearby, recently founded town of Claremont. It moved there but kept its name. Trustee Charles B. Sumner led the college during its first years, helping hire its first official president, Cyrus G. Baldwin, in 1890. The first graduating class, in 1894, had 11 members.

Pomona suffered through a severe financial crisis during its early years, but raised enough money to add several buildings to its campus. Although the first Asian and black students enrolled in 1897 and 1900, respectively, the student body (like most others of the era) remained almost all white throughout this period. In 1905, during president George A. Gates' tenure, the college acquired a  parcel of land to its east known as the Wash. In 1911, as high schools became more common in the region, the college eliminated its preparatory department, which had taught pre-college level courses. The following year, it committed to a liberal arts model, soon after turning its previously separate schools of art and music into departments within the college. In 1914, the Phi Beta Kappa honor society established a chapter at the college. Daily attendance at chapel was mandated until 1921, and student culture emphasized athletics and academic class rivalries. During World War I, male students were divided into three military companies and a Red Cross unit to assist in the war effort.

Mid-20th century

Confronted with growing demand in the 1920s, Pomona's fourth president, James A. Blaisdell, considered whether to grow the college into a large university that could acquire additional resources or remain a small institution capable of providing a more intimate educational experience. Seeking both, he pursued an alternative path inspired by the collegiate university model he observed at Oxford, envisioning a group of independent colleges sharing centralized resources such as a library. On October 14, 1925, Pomona's 38th anniversary, the college founded the Claremont Colleges consortium. Construction of the Clark dormitories on North Campus (then the men's campus) began in 1929, a reflection of president Charles Edmunds' prioritization of the college's residential life. Edmunds, who had previously served as president of Lingnan University in Guangzhou, China, inspired a growing interest in Asian culture at the college and established its Asian studies program.

Pomona's enrollment declined during the Great Depression as students became unable to afford tuition, and its budget was slashed by a quarter. The college reoriented itself toward wartime activities again during World War II, hosting an Air Force military meteorology program and Army Specialized Training Program courses in engineering and foreign languages.

Postwar transformations
Pomona's longest-serving president, E. Wilson Lyon, guided the college through a transformational and turbulent period from 1941 to 1969. The college's enrollment rose above 1,000 following the war, leading to the construction of several residence halls and science facilities. Its endowment grew steadily, due in part to the introduction in 1942 of a deferred giving fundraising scheme pioneered by Allen Hawley called the Pomona Plan, where participants receive a lifetime annuity in exchange for donating to the college upon their death. The plan's model has since been adopted by many other colleges.

Lyon made several progressive decisions relating to civil rights, including supporting Japanese-American students during internment and establishing an exchange program in 1952 with Fisk University, a historically black university in Tennessee. He and dean of women Jean Walton ended the gender segregation of Pomona's residential life, first with the opening of Frary Dining Hall (then part of the men's campus) to women beginning in 1957 and later with the elimination of parietal rules in the late 1960s and the introduction of co-educational housing in 1968. The student body, influenced by the countercultural revolution, became less socially conservative and more politically engaged in this era. Protesters opposed to the Vietnam War occupied Sumner Hall to obstruct Air Force recruiters in 1968 and forced the cancellation of classes at the end of the spring 1970 semester. The college's ethnic diversity also began to increase, and activists successfully pushed the consortium to establish black and Latino studies programs in 1969. A bomb exploded at the Carnegie Building that February, permanently injuring a secretary; no culprit was ever identified.

During the tenure of president David Alexander from 1969 to 1991, Pomona gained increased prominence on the national stage. The endowment increased ten-fold, enabling the construction and renovation of a number of buildings. Several identity-based groups, such as the Pomona College Women's Union (founded in 1984), were established. In the mid-1980s, out-of-state students began to outnumber in-state students.

In 1991, the college converted the dormitory basements used by fraternities into lounges, arguing that this created a more equitable distribution of campus space. The move lowered the profile of Greek life on campus.

21st century

In the 2000s, under president David W. Oxtoby, Pomona began placing more emphasis on reducing its environmental impact, committing in 2003 to obtaining LEED certifications for new buildings and launching various sustainability initiatives. The college also entered partnerships with several college access groups (including the Posse Foundation in 2004 and QuestBridge in 2005) and committed to meeting the full demonstrated financial need of students through grants rather than loans in 2008. These efforts, combined with Pomona's previously instituted need-blind admission policy, resulted in increased enrollment of low-income and racial minority students.

In 2008, it was discovered that Pomona's alma mater may have been originally written to be sung as the ensemble finale to a student-produced blackface minstrel show performed on campus in 1909 or 1910. The college stopped singing it at convocation and commencement, alienating some alumni.

Pomona requested proof of legal residency from employees amid a unionization drive by dining hall workers in 2011. Seventeen workers who were unable to provide documentation were fired, drawing national media attention and sparking criticism from activists; the dining hall staff voted to unionize in 2013. A rebranding initiative that year sought to emphasize students' passion and drive, angering students who thought it would lead to a more stressful culture. Several protests in the 2010s criticized the college's handling of sexual assault, leading to various reforms.

In 2017, G. Gabrielle Starr became Pomona's tenth president; she is the first woman and first African American to hold the office. From March 2020 through the spring 2021 semester, the college switched to online instruction in response to the COVID-19 pandemic.

Campus

It is directly northwest of the Claremont Village (the city's downtown commercial district) and directly south of the other contiguous Claremont Colleges. The area has a Mediterranean climate and consists of a gentle slope from the alluvial fan of San Antonio Creek in the San Gabriel Mountains to the north.

In its early years, Pomona quickly expanded from its initial home in Sumner Hall, constructing several buildings to accommodate its growing enrollment and ambitions. After 1908, development of the campus was guided by master plans from architect Myron Hunt, who envisioned a central quadrangle flanked by buildings connected via visual axes. In 1923, landscape architect Ralph Cornell expanded on Hunt's plans, envisioning a "college in a garden" defined by native Southern California vegetation but incorporating global influences in the tradition of the acclimatization movement. President James Blaisdell's decision to purchase undeveloped land around Pomona while it was still available later gave the college room to grow and found the consortium. Many of the earlier buildings were constructed in the Mission Revival and Spanish Colonial Revival styles, with stucco walls and red terracotta tile roofs. Other and later construction incorporated elements of neoclassical, Victorian, Italian Romanesque, modern, and postmodern styles. As a result, the present campus features a blend of architectural styles. Most buildings are three or fewer stories in height, and are designed to facilitate both indoor and outdoor use.

The campus consists of 88 facilities , including 70 addressed buildings. It is bounded by First Street on the south, Mills and Amherst Avenues on the east, Eighth Street on the north, and Harvard Avenue on the west. It is informally divided into North Campus and South Campus by Sixth Street, with most academic buildings in the western half and a naturalistic area known as the Wash in the east. It has been featured in numerous films and television shows, often standing in for other schools.

Pomona has undertaken initiatives to make its campus more sustainable, including requiring that all new construction be built to LEED Gold standards, replacing turf with drought-tolerant landscaping, and committing to achieving carbon neutrality without the aid of purchased carbon credits by 2030. The Association for the Advancement of Sustainability in Higher Education gave the college a gold rating in its 2018 Sustainable Campus Index.

South Campus

South Campus consists of mostly first-year and second-year housing and academic buildings for the social sciences, arts, and humanities.

A row of four residence halls is south of Bonita Avenue, with Frank Dining Hall at the eastern end. Sumner Hall, the home of admissions and several other administrative departments, is to the north of the dormitories. Oldenborg Center, a foreign-language housing option that includes a foreign-language dining hall, is across from Sumner.

South Campus has several arts buildings and performance venues. Bridges Auditorium ("Big Bridges") is used for concerts and speakers and has a capacity of 2,500. Bridges Hall of Music ("Little Bridges") is a concert hall with seating for 550. On the western edge of campus is the Benton Museum of Art, which has a collection of approximately  including Italian Renaissance panel paintings, indigenous American art and artifacts, and American and European prints, drawings, and photographs. The Seaver Theatre Complex has a 335-seat thrust stage theater and 125-seat black box theater, among other facilities. The Studio Art Hall garnered national recognition for its steel-frame design when it was completed in 2014.

Pomona's main social science and humanities buildings are located west of College Avenue. They include the Carnegie Building, a neoclassical structure built in 1908 as a Carnegie library. Several historic Victorian houses line the southern portion of the avenue, including the Queen Anne–style Renwick House, which was listed on the National Register of Historic Places in 2016.

Marston Quadrangle, a  lawn framed by California sycamore and coastal redwood trees, serves as a central artery for the campus, anchored by Carnegie on the west and Bridges Auditorium on the east. To its north is Alexander Hall, the college's central administration building, and the Smith Campus Center (SCC), home to many student services and communal spaces. East of the SCC is the Center for Athletics, Recreation and Wellness (Pomona's primary indoor athletics and recreation facility) and Smiley Hall dormitory, built in 1908.

At the intersection of Sixth Street and College Avenue are the college gates, built in 1914, which mark the historical northern edge of the campus. They bear two quotes from President BlaisdellPomona's fourth president, James A. Blaisdell. On the north is "let only the eager, thoughtful and reverent enter here", and on the south is "They only are loyal to this college who departing bear their added riches in trust for mankind". Per campus tradition, enrolling students walk south through the gates during orientation and seniors walk north through them shortly before graduation.

The less-developed  eastern portion of the campus is known as the Wash (formally Blanchard Park), and contains a large grove of coast live oak trees, as well as many of the college's athletics facilities, an outdoor amphitheater, an astronomical observatory, and the Pomona College Organic Farm, an experiment in sustainable agriculture.

North Campus
North Campus was designed by architect Sumner Spaulding, and its initial phase was completed in 1930. It consists primarily of residential buildings for third- and fourth-year students and academic buildings for the natural sciences.

The academic buildings are located to the west of North College Way. This area includes Dividing the Light (2007), a skyspace by Light and Space artist and alumnus James Turrell.

The residence halls include the Clark halls (I, III, and V) and several more recent constructions. The North Campus dining hall, Frary Dining Hall, features a vaulted ceiling and is the location of the murals Prometheus (1930) by José Clemente Orozco, the first Mexican fresco in the U.S., and Genesis (1960) by Rico Lebrun.

Other facilities

The college owns the  Trails Ends Ranch (a wilderness area in the Webb Canyon north of campus), the  Mildred Pitt Ranch in southeastern Monterey County, and the Halona Lodge retreat center in Idyllwild, California. The astronomy department built and operates a telescope at the Table Mountain Observatory in Big Pines, California.

Along the north side of campus are several joint buildings maintained by The Claremont Colleges Services.  The consortium also owns the Robert J. Bernard Field Station north of Foothill Boulevard.

Organization and administration

Governance
Pomona is governed as a private, nonprofit organization by a board of trustees responsible for overseeing the long-term interests of the college. The board consists of up to 42 members, most of whom are elected by existing members to four-year terms with a term limit of 12 years. It is responsible for hiring the college's president ( since ), approving budgets, setting overarching policies, and various other tasks. The president, in turn, oversees the college's general operation, assisted by administrative staff and a faculty cabinet. The college has  total employees as of the   semester. Pomona operates under a shared governance model, in which faculty and students sit on many policymaking committees and have a degree of control over other major decisions.

Academic affiliations

Pomona is the founding member of the Claremont Colleges (colloquially "7Cs", for "seven colleges"), a consortium of five undergraduate liberal arts colleges ("5Cs")—Pomona, Scripps, Claremont McKenna, Harvey Mudd, and Pitzer—and two graduate schools—Claremont Graduate University and Keck Graduate Institute. All are located in Claremont. Although each member has individual autonomy and a distinct identity, there is substantial collaboration through The Claremont Colleges Services (TCCS), a coordinating entity that manages the central library, campus safety services, health services, and other resources. Overall, the 7Cs have been praised by higher education experts for their close cooperation, although there have been occasional tensions. Pomona is the largest undergraduate and wealthiest member.

Pomona is a member of several other consortia of selective colleges, including the 568 Group, the Consortium of Liberal Arts Colleges, the Oberlin Group, and the Annapolis Group. The college is accredited by the WASC Senior College and University Commission, which reaffirmed its status in 2021 with particular praise for its diversity initiatives.

Finances, costs, and financial aid

Pomona has an endowment of $ , giving it the seventh-highest endowment per student of any college or university in the U.S. The college's total assets (including its campus) are valued at $. Its operating budget for the  academic year  $, of which roughly half  funded by endowment earnings. In 2021, 46 percent of the budget was allocated to instruction, 1 percent to research, 1 percent to public service, 14 percent to academic support, 15 percent to student services, and 23 percent to institutional support. In 2021, Fitch Ratings gave the college a AAA bond credit rating, its highest rating, reflecting an "extremely strong financial profile".

In 20222023, 52 percent of students received a financial aid package, with an average award of $59,183, including 40 percent of international students, who received an average award of $67,160. The college meets the full demonstrated need of all admitted students, including international students, through grants rather than loans. It does not offer merit awards or athletic scholarships.

Academics and programs

Pomona offers instruction in the liberal arts disciplines and awards the Bachelor of Arts degree. The college operates on a semester system, with a normal course load of four full-credit classes per semester. 32 credits and a C average GPA are needed to graduate, along with the requirements of a major, a first-year critical inquiry seminar, at least one course in each of six "breadth of study" areas, proficiency in a foreign language, two physical education courses, a writing-intensive course, a speaking-intensive course, and an "analyzing difference" course (typically examining a type of structural inequality).

Pomona offers 48 majors, most of which also have a corresponding minor. For the 2022 graduation cohort, 23 percent of students majored in the arts and humanities, 39 percent in the natural sciences, 22 percent in the social sciences, and 16 percent in interdisciplinary fields. 15 percent of students completed a double major, 23 percent completed a minor, and 3 percent completed multiple minors. The college does not permit majoring in pre-professional disciplines such as medicine or law but offers academic advising for those areas and 3-2 engineering programs with Caltech, Dartmouth, and Washington University.

Courses 
Individually, Pomona offers approximately 650 courses per semester. Additionally, students may take a significant portion of their courses at the other Claremont Colleges, enabling access to approximately 2,700 courses total. The academic calendars and registration procedures across the colleges are synchronized and consolidated, and there are no additional fees for cross-enrollment. Students may also create independent study courses evaluated by faculty mentors.

All classes at Pomona are taught by professors (as opposed to teaching assistants). The average class size is 15; for the fall 2022 semester, 92 percent of traditional courses had under 30 students, and only three courses had 50 or more students. The college employs  faculty members as of the   semester, approximately four-fifths of whom are full-time, resulting in a  ratio of students to full-time equivalent professors. Among full-time faculty, 37 percent are members of racial minority groups, 50 percent are women, and 96 percent have a doctorate or other terminal degree in their field. Students and professors often form close relationships, and the college provides faculty with free meals to encourage them to eat with students. Semesters end with a week-long final examination period preceded by two reading days. The college operates several resource centers to help students develop academic skills in quantitative tasks, writing, and foreign languages.

Research, study abroad, and professional development 
More than half of Pomona students conduct research with faculty. The college sponsors an annual Summer Undergraduate Research Program (SURP), in which more than 200 students are paid a stipend of up to $5,600 to conduct research with professors or pursue independent research projects with professorial mentorship. The Pomona College Humanities Studio, established in 2018, supports research in the humanities. Pomona is home to the Pacific Basin Institute, a research institute that studies issues pertaining to the Pacific Rim. 

Before the pandemic, approximately half of Pomona students studied abroad. , the college offers 69 pre-approved programs in 39 countries. Study-away programs are available for Washington, D.C., Silicon Valley, and the Marine Biological Laboratory in Massachusetts, and semester exchanges are offered at Colby, Spelman, and Swarthmore colleges.

The Pomona College Career Development Office (CDO) provides students and alumni with career advising, networking, and other pre-professional opportunities. It runs the Pomona College Internship Program (PCIP), which provides stipends for completing unpaid or underpaid internships during the semester or summer; more than 250 students participate annually. The office connects students with alumni for networking and mentoring via the Sagehen Connect platform. During the 20152016 academic year, 175 employers hosted on-site informational events at the Claremont Colleges and 265 unique organizations were represented in 9 career fairs.

Outcomes

For the 2017 through 2020 entering classes, 94 percent of students returned for their second year, giving Pomona one of the highest retention rates of any college or university in the U.S. For the 2016 entering class, 87 percent of students graduated within four years (among the highest rate of any U.S. college or university) and 94 percent graduated within six years.

Within 10 years, 81 percent of Pomona graduates attend graduate or professional school, according to a 2017 alumni survey. The college ranked 12th among all U.S. colleges and universities for doctorates awarded to alumni per capita, according to data collected by the National Science Foundation for 2011 to 2020. The top destinations between 2009 and 2018 (in order) were the University of California, Los Angeles; the University of California, Berkeley; Harvard University; the University of Southern California; and Stanford University. A 2021 analysis of the schools that send the most students per capita to the highest-ranked U.S. medical, business, and law schools placed Pomona 14th for medical schools, 22nd for business schools, and 9th for law schools.

The top industries for graduates are technology; education; consulting and professional services; finance; government, law, and politics; arts, entertainment, and media; healthcare and social services; nonprofits; and research. Pomona alumni earn a median early career salary of $73,700 and a median mid-career salary of $146,400, according to 2021 survey data from compensation analytics company PayScale.

Pomona ranks among the top producers of recipients of various competitive postgraduate fellowships, including the Churchill Scholarship, Fulbright Program, Goldwater Scholarship, Marshall Scholarship, National Science Foundation graduate research fellowship, and Rhodes Scholarship.

Reputation and rankings

Pomona is considered the most prestigious liberal arts college in the Western United States and one of the most prestigious in the country. However, among the broader public, it has less name recognition than many larger schools.

The 2022 U.S. News & World Report Best Colleges Ranking places Pomona third in the national liberal arts colleges category out of 223 colleges. Pomona has been ranked in the top 10 liberal arts colleges every year by U.S. News since it began ranking them in 1984, and is one of five schools with such a history, alongside Amherst, Swarthmore, Wellesley, and Williams.

Pomona has rated similarly in other college rankings. In 2015, the Forbes ranking placed it first among all colleges and universities in the U.S., drawing media attention. Pomona is the third most desirable college or university in the U.S., according to a 2020 analysis of admitted students' revealed preferences among their college choices conducted by the digital credential service Parchment.

People

Admissions 

Pomona offers three routes for students to apply: the Common Application, the QuestBridge application, and the Coalition Application. Applicants who want an earlier, binding decision can apply via early decision I or II; others apply through regular decision. Additionally, the college enrolls two 10-student Posse Foundation cohorts, from Chicago and Miami, in each class.

Pomona considers various factors in its admissions process, placing greatest importance on course rigor, class rank, GPA, application essays, recommendations, extracurricular activities, talent, and character. Interviews, test scores, first generation status, geographic residence, race and ethnicity, volunteer work, and work experience are considered. Alumni relationships, religious affiliation, and level of interest are not considered. Admission is need-blind for students who are U.S. citizens, permanent residents, DACA recipients, undocumented, or graduates of a U.S. high school, and need-aware for international students. The college is part of many coalitions and initiatives targeted at recruiting underrepresented demographics.

Pomona has the lowest acceptance rate of any national liberal arts college in the U.S. . The college admitted  of applicants for the  entering class chose to enroll. The number of transfer applicants admitted has varied by year; in 2022, Pomona admitted 36 of 487 applicants (7.4 percent).

Student body

, Pomona's student body  of  degree-seeking undergraduate students and a token number of non–degree seeking students. Compared to its closest liberal arts peers, Pomona has been characterized as laid back, academically oriented, mildly quirky, and politically liberal.

The student body is roughly evenly split between men and women, and 91 percent of students are under 22 years old. Approximately 62 percent of domestic students are non-white and 12 percent of students are international, making Pomona one of the most racially and ethnically diverse colleges in the U.S. The geographic origins of the student body are also diverse, with all 50 U.S. states, the major U.S. territories, and more than 60 foreign countries represented. Twenty-seven percent of students are from California, with sizable concentrations from the other western states. The median family income of students was $166,500 , with 52 percent of students coming from the top 10 percent highest-earning families and 22 percent from the bottom 60 percent. The college has been increasing its enrollment of low-income students since the early 2000s, and was ranked second among all private institutions and eighth among all institutions in The New York Times 2017 College Access Index, a measure of economic diversity. Various religious and spiritual beliefs are represented among students, with many leaning secular.

Among students in the 2022 entering class who submitted test scores, the middle 50 percent scored 730770 on the SAT evidence-based reading and writing section, 750790 on the SAT math section, and 3235 on the ACT. Among students with an official high school class rank, 31 percent were valedictorians, 91 percent ranked in the top tenth, and 98 percent ranked in the top quarter.

Noted alumni and faculty

Student life

Residential life 

Pomona is a residential campus, and nearly all students live on campus for all four years in one of the college's sixteen residence halls. All first-year students live on South Campus, and most third- and fourth-year students live on North Campus. Housing is offered in various configurations, including singles, one-room or two-room doubles, and "friendship suites" consisting of a cluster of rooms, often around a central common area. All incoming students are placed into a sponsor group, with ten to twenty peers and two or three upper-class "sponsors" tasked with easing the transition to college life but not enforcing rules (a duty given to resident advisors). Sponsor groups often share activities such as "fountaining", a tradition in which students are thrown into a campus fountain on their birthday. The program dates back to 1927 for women and was expanded in 1950 to include men.

Pomona's social scene is intertwined with that of the other , with many activities and events shared between the colleges. The college's alcohol policies are aimed at encouraging responsible consumption and include a strict ban of hard liquor on South Campus. Dedicated substance-free housing is also offered. Overall, drinking culture is present but does not dominate over other elements of campus life, nor does athletics culture. Violations of the student code are typically handled by the student-run Judicial Council, known as "J-Board".

Pomona's dining services are run in house. All on-campus students are required to have a meal plan, which can be used at any of the Claremont Colleges' seven buffet-style dining halls. The menus emphasize sustainable and healthy options, and the food quality is generally praised. Every night Sunday through Wednesday, Frary Dining Hall opens for a late-night snack.

Campus organizations

Some extracurricular organizations at Pomona are specific to the college, whereas others are open to students at all of the Claremont Colleges.

The Associated Students of Pomona College (ASPC) is Pomona's official student government. Composed of elected representatives and appointed committee members, ASPC distributes funding for clubs and organizations, represents the student body in discussions with the administration, runs student programming (such as the Yule Ball dance and Ski-Beach Day) through the Pomona Events Committee (PEC), and provides various student services such as an airport rideshare program.

 Pomona's yearbook, Metate, was founded in 1894 and discontinued in 2012. The college's official magazine, Pomona College Magazine, is published three times per year by the communications office.

Pomona has numerous clubs or support offices which provide resources and mentoring programs for students with particular identities, including female, non-white, Asian, South Asian, Latino, black, indigenous, multi-ethnic or multi-racial, international, queer, religious, and undocumented or  recipient students. The college's first-generation and low-income community, FLI Scholars, has more than 200 members. The Campus Advocates and EmPOWER Center support survivors of sexual violence and work to promote consent culture.

The Pomona Student Union (PSU) facilitates the discussion of political and social issues on campus by hosting discussions, panels, and debates with prominent speakers holding diverse viewpoints. Other speech and debate organizations include a mock trial team, model UN team, and debate union. Pomona's secret society, Mufti, is known for gluing small sheets of paper around campus with cryptic puns offering social commentary on campus happenings.

Pomona's music department manages several ensembles, including an orchestra, band, choir, glee club, jazz ensemble, and Balinese gamelan ensemble. All students can receive free private music lessons. 

The Draper Center for Community Partnerships, established in 2009, coordinates Pomona's various community engagement programs. These include mentoring for local youth communities, English tutoring for Pomona staff, and volunteering trips over spring break. It also operates the Pomona Academy for Youth Success (PAYS), a three-year pre-college summer program for local low-income and first-generation students of color.

Pomona has two remaining local Greek letter organizations, Sigma Tau and Kappa Delta, both of which are co-educational. Neither have special housing, and Greek life is not considered a major part of the social scene on campus the way it is at many other U.S. colleges.

Traditions

Forty-seven reverence

Other traditions

As part of Pomona's 10-day orientation, incoming students spend four days off campus completing an "Orientation Adventure" or "OA" trip. The OA program began in 1995, and is one of the oldest outdoor orientation programs in the U.S.

Every spring, the college hosts "Ski-Beach Day", in which students visit a ski resort in the morning and then head to the beach after lunch. The tradition dates back to an annual mountain picnic established in 1891.

Since the 1970s, Pomona has used a cinder block flood barrier along the northern edge of its campus, Walker Wall, as a free speech wall. Over the years, provocative postings on the wall have spawned numerous controversies.

Transportation

Pomona's campus is located immediately north of Claremont Station, where the Metrolink San Bernardino Line train provides regular service to Los Angeles Union Station (the city's main transit hub) and the Foothill Transit bus system connects to cities in the San Gabriel Valley and Pomona Valley.

Pomona's "Green Bikes" program maintains a fleet of more than 300 bicycles that are rented free to students each semester.

Athletics

Pomona'sPitzer's varsity athletics teams compete jointly with Pitzer CollegePomona College (another consortium member) as the Pomona-Pitzer Sagehens. The 11 women's and 10 men's teams participate in NCAA Division III in the Southern California Intercollegiate Athletic Conference (SCIAC). Pomona-Pitzer's mascot is Cecil the Sagehen, a greater sage-grouse, and its colors are blue and orange. Its main rival is the Claremont-Mudd-Scripps Stags and Athenas (CMS), the other sports combination of the Claremont Colleges. 

Club and intramural sports are also offered in various areas, such as dodgeball, flag football, and surfing. The physical education department offers a variety of activity classes each semester, such as karate, playground games, geocaching, and social dance.

Athletics history

Pomona's first intercollegiate sports teams were formed in 1895. They competed under several names in the school's early years; the name "Sagehen" first appeared in 1913 and became the sole moniker in 1917. Pomona was one of the three founding members of the SCIAC in 1914, and its football team played in the inaugural game at the Los Angeles Coliseum in 1923. In 1946, Pomona joined with Claremont Men's College (which would later be renamed Claremont McKenna College) to compete as Pomona-Claremont. The teams separated in 1956, and Pomona's athletics program operated independently until it joined with Pitzer College in 1970.

Notes

References

Bibliography

External links

Website of The Student Life, the Claremont Colleges newspaper
Accreditation information at WASC Senior College and University Commission

 
Claremont Colleges
Liberal arts colleges in California
Universities and colleges in Los Angeles County, California
Private universities and colleges in California
Schools accredited by the Western Association of Schools and Colleges
Educational institutions established in 1887
Claremont, California
1887 establishments in California